Samuel Vernon Washington (August 10, 1923 – June 7, 1988) was an American character  actor who starred in film and television.

Biography
Washington was born and raised in Hartford, Connecticut, the 8th child of Benjamin and Olive Evans of Dinwiddie County, Virginia and Frederick, Maryland, respectively. He was 5 feet and 11 inches tall and father of 4 children with his wife, Marion Blunt. Vernon was educated at the Wolter School of Speech and Drama, Carnegie Hall, New York City, where he studied Speech under Madame Annette Wolter and Dr. Walter O. Robinson; and Drama under Rossi, Mary Higgins and Gus Lambluise.

He is best known for his roles in the 1984 science fiction movie The Last Starfighter as Otis and in the 1985 horror movie Friday the 13th: A New Beginning as George and television roles in the 1979 miniseries Roots: The Next Generations as Rev. Mills.  Vernon had a recurring role on the CBS hit series The Jeffersons as Leroy. Later he appeared in an episode of the hit CBS series, Falcon Crest as Teddy Eubanks, a horse groomer.

His special abilities and training include writer, director and producer. He has been awarded the "Stars & Stripes Award" for "Ready, Front, at Ease," a lighthearted Army musical. He was the founder, producer and director of West End Repertory Theatre in New York City. He has served as Artistic Director of Greensburgh, Newark and Staten Island Theatre Arts Workshops; and Assistant Professor of Drama, Staten Island Community College, New York City.

Filmography
Change at 125th Street (1974, TV Movie) as Herbert
Uncle Joe Shannon (1978) as Old Timer
Roots: The Next Generations (1979, TV Mini-Series) as Rev. Mills
The Dark (1979) as Henry Lydell
Pray TV (1981, TV Movie) as Jimmy
Falcon Crest (1983, Episode: "Solitary Confinements") as Teddy Eubanks
The Last Starfighter (1984) as Otis
Joan Rivers and Friends Salute Heidi Horomowitz (1988, TV Special) as himself
Friday the 13th: A New Beginning (1985) as George Winter
Dream West (1986, TV Mini-Series) as Dodson

References

External links
 

1923 births
1988 deaths
African-American male actors
American male film actors
American male television actors
Male actors from Connecticut
20th-century American male actors
20th-century African-American people